William Lewis (September 22, 1868 – August 8, 1959) was a U.S. Representative from Kentucky.

Born in Cutshin, Kentucky, Lewis was raised on a farm and attended the common schools of Leslie and Perry Counties and the Laurel County Seminary, London, Kentucky.
He studied law at the University of Kentucky and at the University of Michigan.
He was Sheriff of Leslie County in 1891 and 1892, and Superintendent of schools of Leslie County 1894–1898.
He served as member of the Kentucky House of Representatives in 1900 and 1901, was
Commonwealth's attorney 1904–1909, and
Circuit judge of the twenty-seventh judicial district of Kentucky 1909–1922 and 1928–1934.
He entered the private practice of law.

Lewis was elected as a Republican to the Eightieth Congress to fill the vacancy caused by the death of John Marshall Robsion and served from April 24, 1948, to January 3, 1949.
Lewis is the oldest person to win his first election to Congress, and was 79 years old at the time he assumed office. He was not a candidate for renomination in 1948 to the Eighty-first Congress.
He died in London, Kentucky, August 8, 1959.
He was interred in A.R. Dyche Memorial Park.

References

1868 births
1959 deaths
Kentucky Commonwealth's Attorneys
Kentucky sheriffs
Kentucky state court judges
People from Leslie County, Kentucky
Republican Party members of the United States House of Representatives from Kentucky
University of Kentucky alumni
University of Michigan Law School alumni